Jacob Cheung Chi-leung is a Hong Kong film director, producer, screenwriter, and actor. His credits include A Battle Of Wits (2006), which was nominated for Best Director and Best Screenplay at the Golden Bauhinia Awards, and Beyond the Sunset (1989), which was nominated for two awards at the 9th Hong Kong Film Awards.

Personal life
Cheung is married to Venus Wong and has four children: the triplets Matthew, Eugene and Jeremy, and their elder sister, Ingrid.

Filmography

Director
 The White Haired Witch of Lunar Kingdom (2014)
 Ticket (Che Piao) (2007) 
 A Battle Of Wits (2006)
 Hero on the Silkroad (2004)
 Never Say Goodbye (2001)
 Midnight Fly (2001)
 The Kid (1999)
 Intimates (1997)
 Whatever Will Be, Will Be (1995)
 The Returning (1994)
 Always on My Mind (1993)
 Lover's Tear (1992)
 Cageman (1992)
Goodbye Hero (1990)
 Beyond the Sunset (1989)
 Lai Shi, China's Last Eunuch (1988)

Actor
 Hong Kong Graffiti (1997)
 My Dad is a Jerk (1997)
 Those were the Days (1996)
 Cageman (1992)
 Au revior, mon amour (1991)
 Hong Kong Godfather (1991)
 All About Women (2008)

Producer
 Midnight Fly (2001)
 Never Say Goodbye (2001)
 The Kid (1999)
 Intimates (1997)
 Signal Left, Turn Right (1996)
 I've Got You, Babe!!! (1994)
 Sparkling Fox (1994)

Screenplay
 A Battle of Wits (2006)
 The Returning (1994)
 Cageman (1992)
 Beyond the Sunset (1989)

Executive Associate Producer
 Mr. Vampire (1985)

External links

 http://hktopten.blogspot.com/2012/06/20120619-tsui-harks-new-film-receives.html

1959 births
Living people
Hong Kong screenwriters
Hong Kong film producers
Hong Kong male film actors
Hong Kong film directors
20th-century Hong Kong male actors
21st-century Hong Kong male actors